The 1905 Calgary municipal election was held on December 11, 1905 to elect a Mayor and twelve Aldermen to sit on the twenty-second Calgary City Council from January 2, 1906 to January 14, 1907.

Nominations closed on December 4, 1905 with incumbent Mayor John Emerson and Aldermen John Rawlings Thompson nominated for Mayor.

Background
The election was held under multiple non-transferable vote where each elector was able to cast a ballot for the mayor and up to three ballots for separate councillors with a voter's designated ward.

Results

Mayor

Councillors

Ward 1

Ward 2

Ward 3

Ward 4

Public School Board
Nominations include:
C.F. Comer
James Walker
E.H. Crandell

Separate School Board
Nominations include:
Thomas McCaffrey
E.H. Rouleau
Rev. A. Lemarchand

By-elections
Ward 4 Alderman David Carter (1863—1906) died on July 1, 1906, John Goodwin Watson was acclaimed as Alderman for Ward 4 on July 23, 1906. His nomination by the Fourth Ward Ratepayers' Association came after a strenuous meeting which almost led to violence.

John Smythe Hall resigned as Alderman for Ward 2 effective November 30, 1906. No by-election was held.

See also
List of Calgary municipal elections

References

Municipal elections in Calgary
1905 elections in Canada
1900s in Calgary